The Florida Botanical Gardens is a  botanical garden located in Largo, Florida. The park showcases flora, fauna, and natural resources in motivational surroundings that promote environmentally friendly techniques.

History
The idea of the gardens started in 1991 when the Cooperative Extension Service proposed the founding of a new outdoor learning center. The plan gained support from the Pinellas county commission, which pledged $1 million and 13 additional acres for the new facility.

Types of gardens

The Florida Botanical Gardens consists of several different gardens, including the Butterfly Garden, Cactus/Succulent Garden, Cottage Garden, Herb Garden, Jazz Garden, Tropical Fruit Garden, Tropical Courtyard, The Vinery, and more.

The Wedding Garden is a popular place for weddings of any size, including mass weddings, such as the one that occurred on Valentine's Day in 2020.

The Wetlands Walkway and Wildlife Overlook were added to the Botanical Gardens in 2018, and give visitors a closer look at the native flora and fauna surrounding its boardwalk trail  and viewing areas.

A two-acre Children's Discovery Garden is set to break ground in 2021 as a park and education space for children and families and will include an outdoor classroom, raised beds and a potting area, a pollinator landing, trails, and play equipment.

Programs and partnerships 
The Florida Botanical Gardens is managed by Pinellas County Parks and Conservation Resources Department, and have partnerships with many organizations, such as Creative Pinellas, Florida Native Plant Society, FNGLA (Florida Nursery, Growers and Landscape Association), Florida West Coast Orchid Society, UF/IFAS Extension, Heritage Village, PAVA (Professional Association of Visual Artists), Pinellas County 4-H Association, Pinellas County Farm Bureau, Tampa Bay Water, Pinellas County, and Pinellas Community Foundation. 

These partnerships create activities and events for people of all ages, including family-friendly programs like scavenger hunts and art exhibitions. The Gardens' formal partnership with  University of Florida’s Institute of Food and Agricultural Sciences (UF/IFLAS) also provides opportunities for home gardeners and landscape professionals on various procedures. The Florida Botanical Gardens is a demonstration garden for UP/IFLAS.

A collaboration with Tampa Bay Water is providing educational outreach, as the Florida Botanical Gardens Foundation was one of a number of organizations and schools that received a combined $30,000 in grant funds from Tampa Bay Water. $5,500 of this money was used to manufacture and install 15 new educational signs about water use and conservation.

Gallery

See also 
 List of botanical gardens in the United States

References

External links
The Florida Botanical Gardens website

Botanical gardens in Florida
Largo, Florida
Protected areas of Pinellas County, Florida